Fu Ming (born 5 January 1983) is a Chinese football referee. He has been a full international referee for FIFA since 2014. He is a teacher of Jincheng College of Nanjing University of Aeronautics and Astronautics.

On 23 February 2019, it was announced that Fu Ming had been hired by CFA to become one 
of the professional referees in China.

AFC Asian Cup 2019

References 

Chinese football referees
Living people
1983 births
Academic staff of Nanjing University of Aeronautics and Astronautics
AFC Asian Cup referees